Civil Air Transport Flight 106 was a Curtiss C-46D Commando, registration number B-908 (C/N 32950), that was operated by Civil Air Transport, which was a front company operated by the CIA. On 20 June 1964, the aircraft crashed near the village of Shenkang, western Taiwan, killing all 57 people aboard.

The accident
Shortly after take-off from Taichung, the number one engine oversped. The pilot began a left turn to perform an emergency landing at the airport or a nearby military air base. But while turning, the pilot lost control and the aircraft crashed in a left wing low and a steep nose down attitude.

The aircraft
The flight was being operated by a C-46D, which had accumulated 19,488 operational hours from 1944 to 1964.

Causes
The primary cause of the accident was the failure of the #1 engine, compounded by pilot error during attempts at recovery while returning to Taichung Airport.

Passengers 
Among the dead were 20 Americans, one Briton, and members of the Malaysian delegation to the 11th Film Festival in Asia, including businessman Loke Wan Tho and his wife Mavis.

References 

Aviation accidents and incidents in Taiwan
Aviation accidents and incidents in 1964
Accidents and incidents involving the Curtiss-Wright C-46 Commando
Civil Air Transport accidents and incidents
June 1964 events in Asia
1964 in Taiwan
1964 disasters in Taiwan
Aircraft hijackings